Devyani (or Colloquially Devyani... Ekka Raja Rani) was a Marathi television drama that aired on Star Pravah. It premiered on 19 March 2012. Its second season aired from 27 July 2014 with name Devyani... Ekka Raja Rani. The series reaired because of Covid-19 pandemic.

Plot

Season 1 
It is a story of girl named Devyani a college girl whose life gets change after she enters the wedlock with her obsessive and die-hard lover Sangram. Devyani is a girl of her principles that are taught by his father, Sangram is opposite and who always follows his principles in life and is the master of his decisions. The show takes a new turn when Sangram falls head over heels with Devyani and makes all his efforts to let the girl become his wife.

Season 2 
It is a story about Devyani's journey from her childhood till now. Devyani is a confident girl who believes that the bad can be erased off if wanted. According to Devyani, good always beats bad. Devyani aspires to be a crime reporter and wishes to make the society better place to live in.

Cast

Season 1

 Shivani Surve as Devyani Kelkar / Devyani Vikhe-Patil (2012-2013) 
 Deepali Pansare replacing Shivani as Devyani Kelkar / Devyani Vikhe-patil (2013-2014) 
 Sangram Salvi as Sangram Vikhe-Patil (2012-2014) 
 Nagesh Bhonsle as Aabasaheb Vikhe-Patil (2012-2014) 
 Surekha Kudachi as Chandrika Vikhe-Patil (2012-2013) 
 Sunila Karambelkar replacing Surekha as Chandrika Vikhe-Patil (2013-2014) 
 Saii Ranade as Vatsala Vikhe-Patil (2012-2013) 
 Devdatta Nage as Samrat Vikhe-Patil (2013-2014) 
 Samidha Guru as Girija; Samrat's second wife (2013)
 Prachi Pisat as Lavanya Vikhe-Patil (2012) 
 Pooja Kadam replacing Prachi as Lavanya Vikhe-Patil (2012-2014) 
 Gauri Kendre as Aausaheb Vikhe-Patil (2012-2014) 
 Maadhav Deochake as Dr. Namit (2012) 
 Khushboo Tawde as Tara (2013) 
 Madhura Godbole as Devyani's sister (2012-2013) 
 Vidyadhar Joshi as Hambirrao Vikhe-Patil (2013) 
 Mrunal Chemburkar as Hambirrao's wife (2013) 
 Neena Kulkarni as Manjula Vikhe-Patil (Hambirrao's mother) (2013) 
 Prasad Limaye as Vikram Vikhe-Patil (Hambirrao's son) (2013) 
 Rasika Vengurlekar as Rani (2012-2013) 
 Smita Saravade as Mandakini (2012) 
 Anuj Saxena as Advocate Anuj Daftardari (2013) 
 Vibhuti Thakur as Vibhuti Daftardari (2013) 
 Kaustubh Diwan as Lavanya's boyfriend (2013) 
 Sushant Shelar as Police Inspector (2012) 
 Rashmi Anpat as Pallavi (2013) 
 Ravi Patwardhan as Kakasaheb (2013)
 Bharati Patil as Sangram's Kakisaheb (2013)

Season 2 

 Bhagyashree Mote as Devyani Ekka Sawant (2014-2015) 
 Siddhi Karkhanis replacing Bhagyashree as Devyani Ekka Sawant (2015-2016) 
 Vivek Sangle as Ekka Sawant (Baji) (2014-2016) 
 Kishori Ambiye as Surekha Sawant (2014-2016) 
 Shreejit Marathe as Inspector Chittaranjan (Chitta) (2014-2015) 
 Shweta Mahadik as Ekka's Sister-in-law (2014-2015) 
 Omkar Kulkarni as Yashodhan Sawant (Ekka's brother) (2014-2015) 
 Abhidnya Bhave as Veena (2015-2016) 
 Divesh Medge as Vinayak (2015-2016) 
 Sara Shrawan as Sara (Ekka's sister) (2014-2016) 
 Vinod Gaykar as Taimur (Ekka's sidekick) (2014-2016)

Production 
It is produced by Anuj Saxena under the banner of Maverick Productions. 
Season 1 of the show was an official remake of StarPlus show Mann Kee Awaaz Pratigya. It was airing from 19 March 2012 on Star Pravah replacing by Bandh Reshmache.

Casting
It first starred Shivani Surve, Sangram Salvi, Nagesh Bhonsle as Devyani, Sangram and Aabasaheb respectively. Shivani Surve left the show in 2013 as makers weren't giving her time to rest. She was replaced by Deepali Pansare who played the role of Devyani. In 2014, all casts of the show were changed for new story. Parallel lead Bhagyashree Mote playing New Devyani and recurring one Vivek Sangle. In 2015, Bhagyashree Mote also quit the series and Siddhi Karkhanis was cast in the role.

Ratings

References

External links 
 
Devyani at Hotstar

Marathi-language television shows
Star Pravah original programming
2012 Indian television series debuts
2016 Indian television series endings